Wayne Ferreira and Yevgeny Kafelnikov were the defending champions but lost in the second round to Wayne Black and Kevin Ullyett.

Martin Damm and Cyril Suk won in the final 7–5, 7–5 against Black and Ullyett.

Seeds
Champion seeds are indicated in bold text while text in italics indicates the round in which those seeds were eliminated.

Draw

Final

Top half

Bottom half

External links
 2002 Internazionali BNL d'Italia Men's Doubles Draw

Men's Doubles
Italian Open - Doubles